This is a list of schools in the Borough of Bedford, in the English county of Bedfordshire.

State-funded schools

Primary and lower schools

Balliol Primary School, Kempston
Bedford Road Primary School, Kempston
Brickhill Primary School, Brickhill, Bedford
Broadmead Lower School, Stewartby
Bromham CE Primary School, Bromham
Camestone School, Kempston
Carlton CE Primary School, Carlton
Castle Newnham School, Castle, Bedford
Cauldwell School, Cauldwell, Bedford
Christopher Reeves CE Primary School, Podington
Cotton End Forest School, Cotton End
Edith Cavell Primary School, Harpur, Bedford
Eileen Wade Primary School, Upper Dean
Elstow School, Elstow
Goldington Green Academy, Goldington, Bedford
Great Barford CE Primary Academy, Great Barford
Great Denham Primary School, Great Denham
Great Ouse Primary Academy, Biddenham
Harrold Primary Academy, Harrold
Hazeldene School, Putnoe, Bedford
The Hills Academy, Putnoe, Bedford
Kempston Rural Primary School, Kempston Rural
King's Oak Primary School, Kingsbrook, Bedford
Kymbrook Primary School, Keysoe Row
Lakeview School, Wixams
Livingstone Primary School, Harpur, Bedford
Milton Ernest CE Primary School, Milton Ernest
Oakley Primary Academy, Oakley
Pinchmill Primary School, Felmersham
Priory Primary School, Castle, Bedford
Putnoe Primary School, Putnoe, Bedford
Queens Park Academy, Queens Park, Bedford
Ravensden CE Primary Academy, Ravensden
Renhold Primary School, Renhold
Riseley CE Primary School, Riseley
Roxton CE Academy, Roxton
St James CE Primary School, Biddenham
St John Rigby RC Primary School, De Parys, Bedford
St Joseph's and St Gregory's RC Primary School, Queens Park, Bedford
St Lawrence CE Primary School, Wymington
Scott Primary School, Brickhill, Bedford
Shackleton Primary School, Cauldwell, Bedford
Sharnbrook Primary, Sharnbrook
Sheerhatch Primary School, Cople & Willington
Shortstown Primary School, Shortstown
Springfield Primary School, Kempston
Thurleigh Primary School, Thurleigh
Turvey Primary School, Turvey
Ursula Taylor CE School, Clapham
Westfield Primary School, Queens Park, Bedford
Wilden CE Primary School, Wilden
Wilstead Primary School, Wilstead
Wixams Tree Primary, Wixams
Wootton Lower School, Wootton

Middle schools
Marston Vale Middle School, Stewartby

Secondary and upper schools

Bedford Academy, Kingsbrook, Bedford
Bedford Free School, Castle, Bedford
Biddenham International School and Sports College, Biddenham
Castle Newnham School, De Parys, Bedford
Daubeney Academy, Kempston
Goldington Academy, De Parys, Bedford
Kempston Academy, Kempston
Lincroft Academy, Oakley
Mark Rutherford School, Putnoe, Bedford
St Thomas More Catholic School, Brickhill, Bedford
Sharnbrook Academy, Sharnbrook
Wixams Academy, Wixams
Wootton Upper School, Wootton

Special and alternative schools
Grange Academy, Kempston
Greys Education Centre, Kempston
Ridgeway School, Kempston
St John's School and College, Kempston

Further education
Bedford College
The Bedford Sixth Form
Kimberley College

Independent schools

Primary and preparatory schools
Bedford Preparatory School, De Parys, Bedford
Pilgrims Pre-Preparatory School, Brickhill, Bedford
Polam School, Harpur, Bedford

Senior and all-through schools
Bedford Girls' School, Castle, Bedford
Bedford Greenacre Independent School, Bedford
Bedford Modern School, Harpur, Bedford
Bedford School, De Parys, Bedford

Special and alternative schools
Cambian Walnut Tree Lodge School, Wilden
E-Spired, Cauldwell, Bedford
KWS Educational Services, Newnham, Bedford

Further education
Stella Mann College of Performing Arts

Schools in the Borough of Bedford
Bedford
Lists of buildings and structures in Bedfordshire